Steven Justice (born May 26, 1984) is an American former college and professional football player who was a center in the National Football League (NFL) and United Football League (UFL).  He played college football for Wake Forest University, and earned consensus All-American honors.  He was drafted by the Indianapolis Colts in the sixth round of the 2008 NFL Draft, and has played for the NFL's Colts, and the UFL's New York Sentinels and Florida Tuskers.

Early years
Justice was born in Lancaster, Pennsylvania.  He played high school football at New Smyrna Beach High School in New Smyrna Beach, Florida.

College career
Justice attended Wake Forest University in Winston-Salem, North Carolina, and played for coach Jim Grobe's Wake Forest Demon Deacons football team from 2003 to 2007.  He redshirted as a true freshman in 2003.  Along with Steve Vallos, he anchored a standout offensive line as Wake Forest won the 2006 ACC Championship and reached the Orange Bowl. Justice was a first-team All-Atlantic Coast Conference (ACC) selection in 2006 and 2007.  As a senior in 2007, he was recognized as a consensus first-team All-American.

Professional career
He subsequently played in the UFL for the New York Sentinels in 2009, and the Florida Tuskers in 2010 and 2011.

External links

 Just Sports Stats
 Indianapolis Colts bio
 Wake Forest Demon Deacons bio

1984 births
Living people
Sportspeople from Lancaster, Pennsylvania
Players of American football from Pennsylvania
American football centers
Wake Forest Demon Deacons football players
All-American college football players
Indianapolis Colts players
New York Sentinels players
Carolina Panthers players
Florida Tuskers players
Virginia Destroyers players